Katherine Winter may refer to:

 Kathryn Winter, ice dancer
 Katherine Winter, a fictional character in The Reaping